1992 in the Philippines details events of note that happened in the Philippines in the year 1992.

Incumbents
 President
 
Corazon Aquino (PDP-Laban) (until June 30)
Fidel V. Ramos (Lakas) (starting June 30)
 Vice President
Salvador Laurel (UNIDO) (until June 30)
Joseph Estrada (NPC) (starting June 30)
 Senate President
Jovito Salonga (until January 1)
Neptali Gonzales, Sr. (starting January 1)
 House Speaker
Ramon Mitra, Jr. (until June 30)
Jose de Venecia, Jr. (starting July 27)
 Chief Justice: Andres Narvasa
 Philippine Congress
8th Congress of the Philippines (until June 17)
9th Congress of the Philippines (starting July 27)

Events

January
 January 2 – The tailings dam breaks at Number Two tailings storage facility of Philex Mining Corporation's Padcal mine in Benguet Province, releasing 80 million cubic metres of effluent, probably the largest tailings spill in history.
 January 7 – Former First Lady Imelda Marcos is arrested and later released on charges regarding her accounts in Switzerland.
 January 15 – Pag-asa is hatched in Davao City becoming the first Philippine eagle to be successfully bred and hatched in captivity.

February
 February 15 – At least 41 are killed and 24 are wounded when New People's Army guerrillas ambush a large company of army troops in Marihatag, Surigao del Sur.

March
 March 10  – Five students of PUP are found floating in the Pasig River after an altercation during a basketball game involving INC members.

May
 May 11 – Synchronized national and local elections are held.
 May 25 – In PepsiCo's promotion Number Fever, the winning number "349" is announced with a million-peso prize; however, an error causes more than 600,000 winners; several violent incidents followed. By following year, about 22,000 people filed more than five thousand lawsuits against Pepsi, outnumbering those against former Pres. Ferdinand Marcos and Imelda Marcos. In 2006, a court would rule in favor of Pepsi.

June
 June 30 – Former defense secretary Fidel Ramos and former senator Joseph Estrada swear in as the 12th President and 11th Vice President of the Philippines, succeeding Corazon Aquino and Salvador Laurel.

September
 September 22 – Pres. Ramos signs Republic Act 7637, which repeals the Anti-Subversion Act of 1957.
 September 30 – US forces leave Subic Bay Naval Base upon its turn over to the Philippines.

November
 November 24 – Subic Bay Naval Base closes as it is turned over to the local government, with a last batch of American soldiers finally leaving Naval Air Station Cubi Point and returning to the US, ending its military presence in the country.

Holidays

As per Executive Order No. 292, chapter 7 section 26, the following are regular holidays and special days, approved last July 25, 1987. Note that in the list, holidays in bold are "regular holidays" and those in italics are "nationwide special days".

 January 1 – New Year's Day
 April 9 – Araw ng Kagitingan (Bataan and Corregidor Day)
 April 16 – Maundy Thursday
 April 17 – Good Friday
 May 1 – Labor Day
 June 12 – Independence Day 
 August 30 – National Heroes Day
 November 1 –  All Saints Day
 November 30 – Bonifacio Day
 December 25 – Christmas Day
 December 30 – Rizal Day
 December 31 – Last Day of the Year

In addition, several other places observe local holidays, such as the foundation of their town. These are also "special days."

Television

 February 21 – Associated Broadcasting Company (ABC 5) resumed its radio-television operations with their slogans for station ID Come Home to ABC until the last day of July and Catch Up with Today TV in the first day of August.
 May 30 – The first launched of Southern Broadcasting Network local UHF TV station in Metro Manila starting 1992. It was then known as World TV 21 (now Solar Television Network as ETC).

Films
 18th Metro Manila Film Festival
 Boy Recto
 Bakit Labis Kitang Mahal
 Engkanto
 Takbo Talon Tili!
 Shake, Rattle & Roll IV
 Manila Boy
 Okey Ka Fairy Ko!

Sports
 March 20–28 – Pasig and Manila hosts the 1992 ISF Men's World Championship in which 18 nations participated.
 July 25–August 9 – The Philippines competed at the 1992 Summer Olympics in Barcelona, Spain. 26 competitors, 24 men and 2 women, took part in 29 events in 9 sports. Stephen Fernandez and Beatriz Lucero won a bronze medal each in taekwondo, but their medals were not included in the official medal tally because taekwondo was only a demonstration event.
 August 24–29 – The team representing the Zamboanga City Little League won the International Championship of the 1992 Little League World Series held in Pennsylvania. However, it was discovered that the Filipino team violated age and residency rules and Little League stripped them of their title.

Births
 January 2 – Alden Richards, actor and singer
 January 8 – Pamu Pamorada, actress
 January 20: 
 Mark Hartmann, football player
Troy Rosario, basketball player
 February 4:
 Francis Alcantara, tennis player
 Mirriam Manalo, singer and actress
 February 7 – Kylie Verzosa, Miss International 2016
 February 12 – Joseph Eriobu, basketball player
 March 1 – Reden Celda, basketball player
 March 8 – Michelle Dy, vlogger
 March 9 – Samboy de Leon, basketball player
 March 11 – KZ Tandingan, singer and recording artist
 March 16 – Terrence Romeo, basketball player
 March 23 – Ria Atayde, actress
 March 28 – Lucho Ayala, actor
 March 30 – Enrique Gil, actor and singer
 April 6 – Elora Españo, actress
 April 10 – Marion Aunor, singer and recording artist
 April 11 – Nesthy Petecio, boxer
 April 17 – Mutya Johanna Datul, Miss Supranational 2013
 April 19 – Ashley Rivera, actress
 April 25 – Aura Azarcon, actress
 April 28 – Dennis Villanueva, football player
 May 6 – Manuel Ott, football player
 May 8 – Vickie Rushton, actress, beauty pageant contestant and model
 May 9:
 Chris Gutierrez, actor
 Jiro Manio, actor
 May 10:
 Jake Zyrus, singer and actor
 Zia Marquez, actress
 Merellie Manansala, actress
 May 20 – AJ Muhlach, singer and actor
 June 6 – Juvy de Jesus, businesswoman and cosplayer
 June 7 – Jordan Clarkson, basketball player
 June 16 – Roger Pogoy, basketball player
 June 30 – Alfred Labatos, actor
 July 4 – Carl Cari, politician
 July 9 – Jake Vargas, actor and singer
 July 27 – Mark L. Cruz, basketball player
 August 2 – Jio Jalalon, basketball player
 August 3 – Aljon Mariano, basketball player
 August 4 – Neil Coleta, actor
 August 6 – Victor Silayan, actor and model
 August 7 – Jeric Gonzales, actor
 August 28 – Max Collins, actress
 September 1 – Louise delos Reyes, actress
 September 2 – Michele Gumabao, beach and indoor volleyball player and beauty queen
 September 9 – Frencheska Farr, singer, model and actress
 September 24 – Coleen Garcia, actress
 September 29 – Baser Amer, basketball player
 October 17 – Sam Concepcion, singer, dancer, actor, host and model
 October 27 – Apple David, courtside reporter
 October 29 – Mon Abundo, basketball player
 November 1 - Aily Millo, broadcast journalist
 November 10 - Samantha Bernardo, actress, beauty queen and model
 November 20 – Yen Santos, actress
 November 25 – Martin del Rosario, actor
 December 3 – Jessy Mendiola, actress
 December 4 – Russel Escoto, basketball player
 December 6 – Christian Bables, actor
 December 16 – Miho Nishida, actress and former member of Girltrends
 December 22 – Aby Maraño, volleyball player

Deaths
 February 3 – Jay Ilagan, actor (b. 1953)
 February 9 – Apeng Daldal, actor, comedian, vaudevillian, singer and writer (b. 1928) 
 February 14 – Helen Vela, actress, broadcaster (b. 1946)
 March 9 – Isidro Rodriguez, 18th Governor of Rizal and softball sports official (b. 1915)
 March 22 – Joe Cantada, TV host, anchor and commentator (b. 1942)
 May 28 – Lorenzo Tañada, senator (b. 1898)
 August 17 – Tecla San Andres Ziga, senator (b. 1906)
 September 3 – César Bengzon, Chief Justice of the Supreme Court of the Philippines (b. 1896)
 December 2 – Jaime de la Rosa, pre-war and postwar actor (b. 1921)

References

 
1992 in Southeast Asia
Philippines
1990s in the Philippines
Years of the 20th century in the Philippines